The following highways are numbered 236:

Canada
 Manitoba Provincial Road 236
 Newfoundland and Labrador Route 236
 Nova Scotia Route 236
 Prince Edward Island Route 236
 Quebec Route 236

Costa Rica
 National Route 236

Japan
 Japan National Route 236

United States

 California State Route 236
 Florida State Road 236 (former)
 Georgia State Route 236
 Indiana State Road 236
 K-236 (Kansas highway)
 Kentucky Route 236
 Maine State Route 236
 Maryland Route 236
 Massachusetts Route 236
 Minnesota State Highway 236 (former)
 Montana Secondary Highway 236
 New Hampshire Route 236
 New Mexico State Road 236
 New York State Route 236
 Ohio State Route 236
 Oregon Route 236 (former)
 Pennsylvania Route 236 (former)
 Tennessee State Route 236
 Texas State Highway 236
 Utah State Route 236 (former)
 Vermont Route 236
 Virginia State Route 236
 Wyoming Highway 236